Nina Warken (born 15 May 1979) is a German lawyer and politician of the Christian Democratic Union (CDU) who has been serving as a member of the Bundestag from the state of Baden-Württemberg since 2013.

Political career 
Warken first became member of the Bundestag after the 2013 German federal election. She lost her seat in the 2017 German federal election, but was the first in line if a Member for Baden-Württemberg resigned. This happened on 23 November 2018, when Stephan Harbarth was elected President of the Federal Constitutional Court of Germany. She took her seat on 5 December 2018.

In parliament, Warken has served on the Committee on Internal Affairs (2013-2017; since 2020), the Committee on European Affairs (2018), and the Committee on Legal Affairs and Consumer Protection (since 2018). Since 2022, she has also been serving on the parliamentary body in charge of appointing judges to the Highest Courts of Justice, namely the Federal Court of Justice (BGH), the Federal Administrative Court (BVerwG), the Federal Fiscal Court (BFH), the Federal Labour Court (BAG), and the Federal Social Court (BSG).

In the negotiations to form a coalition government under the leadership of Minister-President of Baden-Württemberg Winfried Kretschmann following the 2021 state elections, Warken co-chaired the working group on integration, alongside Manfred Lucha.

Since 2022, Warken has been co-chairing – alongside Johannes Fechner – the Commission for the Reform of the Electoral Law and the Modernization of Parliamentary Work.

Other activities 
 Technisches Hilfswerk, Member

Political positions
In June 2017, Warken voted against Germany's introduction of same-sex marriage.

References

External links 

  
 Bundestag biography 

1979 births
Living people
Members of the Bundestag for Baden-Württemberg
Female members of the Bundestag
21st-century German women politicians
Members of the Bundestag 2021–2025
Members of the Bundestag 2017–2021
Members of the Bundestag 2013–2017
Members of the Bundestag for the Christian Democratic Union of Germany